Vienna, City of Song (German: Wien, du Stadt der Lieder) is a 1930 German musical comedy film directed by Richard Oswald and starring Charlotte Ander, Paul Morgan and Igo Sym. It was shot at the Babelsberg Studios in Berlin. The film's sets were designed by the art director Franz Schroedter.

Cast
 Charlotte Ander as Steffi 
 Paul Morgan as Pokorny, Scheidermeister 
 Igo Sym as Pepi, Pokornys Sohn 
 Max Hansen as Burgstaller, Fleischermeister 
 Siegfried Arno as Ferdinand, Zahlkellner 
 Paul Graetz as Piefke, Reisender aus Berlin 
 Max Ehrlich as Old Printer 
 Sigi Hofer as Ignaz Korn, Steffis Vater 
 Dora Hrach as Emilie, Ingaz Frau 
 Irene Ambrus as Ilona, Verkäuferin 
 Grete Natzler as Frau Bock, Cafétiere 
 Gustl Gstettenbaur as Gustl, Pikkolo 
 Luigi Bernauer as Natursänger

References

Bibliography
 Bock, Hans-Michael & Bergfelder, Tim. The Concise CineGraph. Encyclopedia of German Cinema. Berghahn Books, 2009.
 Prawer, S.S. Between Two Worlds: The Jewish Presence in German and Austrian Film, 1910-1933. Berghahn Books, 2005.

External links

1930 films
Films of the Weimar Republic
1930 musical comedy films
German musical comedy films
1930s German-language films
Films directed by Richard Oswald
Films set in Vienna
Wiener Film
German black-and-white films
1930s German films
Films shot at Babelsberg Studios